Rhewl railway station was a station in Rhewl, Llanynys, Denbighshire, Wales. The station was opened on 1 March 1862 and closed on 30 April 1962. The main station building and sections of the platform are still extant and in use as a private dwelling.

References

Further reading

Disused railway stations in Denbighshire
Railway stations in Great Britain opened in 1862
Railway stations in Great Britain closed in 1962
Former London and North Western Railway stations